Parsian IF is a Swedish football club located in Upplands Väsby, Stockholm that plays in the Swedish Division 5. The club represents the Iranian community in Sweden.

History

Establishment
Founded in 2013 by the brothers Shahin and Shahram Shabani. Parsian IF became one of the first football clubs created by Swedish-Iranians residing in Stockholm. The club promotes men's and women's football and futsal participation, having hosted the inaugural Uhlsport Futsal Cup on 26 December 2013. Parsian Väsby IF is affiliated with Stockholms Fotbollförbund of the Swedish Football Association. To the 2019 season they moved to Upplands Väsby after Väsby IK had been closed down.

Promotions
In October 2017 Parsian IF finished first place in their Division 6 group and were promoted to Division 5, the seventh tier of Swedish football.

Season to season

References

External links
 Parsian Väsby IF – Official website 

Football clubs in Stockholm
Diaspora sports clubs
Iranian football clubs in Sweden